Wila Qullu (Aymara wila blood, blood-red, qullu mountain, "red mountain", hispanicized spelling Wila Kkollu, Wila Kollu) is a mountain in the Andes in Bolivia, about  high. It is located in the Oruro Department, Challapata Province, Challapata Municipality. Wila Qullu is situated south of Jach'a River and north of Nacional Route 1. It lies north-west of the mountain Wila Quta which reaches the same height.

The Jach'a Juqhu River which is considered to be the origin of the Pillku Mayu flows along the southern slopes of the mountain.

See also
 Ch'iyar Jaqhi
 Kachi Mayu
 Kuntur Nasa
 Qullpa Jawira
 List of mountains in the Andes

References 

Mountains of Oruro Department